The Rocky River Run (currently branded as the 7 Rocky River Run for sponsorship reasons) is a half-marathon fun run held in the Australian city of Rockhampton in either late May or early June each year.

The event also incorporates 10-kilometre, 5-kilometre and 2-kilometre events.  The courses are centred around Rockhampton's Fitzroy River and all except the 2-kilometre course traverse the heritage-listed Alexandra Bridge and the Fitzroy Bridge.

The Rocky River Run began when the local Rotary Club created the event in 2007 with just 358 entrants competing but has steadily grown in popularity.

Rotary continued to organise the Rocky River Run until it grew so large it became difficult for the community group to organise and were considering cancelling the event in 2016.  However, they reached an agreement with local employment agency Capricorn Training Company to take over the organisation of the event.

In 2017, the Seven Network became the official naming rights sponsor.

The event celebrated its 10th anniversary in 2017.

In recent years, the number of competitors has been fluctuating around 2000 competitors.

The event is held as a way to raise money for charities, namely youth suicide preventative and mental health initiatives such as RUOK? Day.

In 2017, the event raised $15,000 for R U OK? Day initiatives and another $15,000 for Ronald McDonald House Charities.

Originally commencing from Victoria Park in Wandal, the Rocky River Run moved to the newly redeveloped Quay Street riverside precinct in the city in 2017.

Results 
The winners of the Rocky River Run half-marathon and their recorded times since 2013:

See also 
 Bridge to Brisbane
 Gold Coast Half Marathon
 List of half marathon races

References 

Athletics competitions in Australia
2007 establishments in Australia
Recurring sporting events established in 2007
Sport in Rockhampton
Sports competitions in Queensland
Running in Australia